The Këlcyrë Gorge is a gorge in southern Albania created by the river Vjosë, near the town of Këlcyrë. 

 

The gorge became famous during the Capture of Klisura Pass battle during the Greco-Italian War in World War II. A Greek military cemetery for the fallen Greek soldiers is located within the pass.

See also
Këlcyrë
Kelcyre Castle
Tourism in Albania
History of Albania

References

Canyons and gorges of Albania
Geography of Gjirokastër County